UT-D Baseball Field is a baseball venue located in Richardson, TX and home to the UT Dallas Comets baseball program, which was added in 2002.  The ballpark holds a capacity of 250.  The Comets participate in the American Southwest Conference.

References

Baseball venues in the Dallas–Fort Worth metroplex
Baseball venues in Texas